A coat typically is an outer garment for the upper body as worn by either gender for warmth or fashion. Coats typically have long sleeves and are open down the front and closing by means of buttons, zippers, hook-and-loop fasteners, toggles, a belt, or a combination of some of these. Other possible features include collars, shoulder straps and hoods.

Etymology 
Coat is one of the earliest clothing category words in English, attested as far back as the early Middle Ages. (See also Clothing terminology.) The Oxford English Dictionary traces coat in its modern meaning to c. 1300, when it was written cote or cotte. The word coat stems from Old French and then Latin cottus. It originates from the Proto-Indo-European word for woolen clothes.

An early use of coat in English is coat of mail (chainmail), a tunic-like garment of metal rings, usually knee- or mid-calf length.

History 
The origins of the Western-style coat can be traced to the sleeved, close-fitted and front-fastened coats worn by the nomads of the Central Asian steppes in the eleventh century, though this style of coat may be much older, having been found with four-thousand-year-old Tarim mummies. The medieval and renaissance coat (generally spelled cote or cotte by costume historians) is a mid-length, sleeved outer garment worn by both men and women, fitted to the waist and buttoned up the front, with a full skirt in its essentials, not unlike the modern coat.

By the eighteenth century, overcoats had begun to supplant capes and cloaks as outerwear in Western fashion. Before the Industrial Revolution, which began in the second half of the eighteenth century, the extremely high cost of cloth meant certain styles of clothing represented wealth and rank, but as cloth became more affordable post-industrialization, people within a lower social class could adopt the fashionable outdoor wear of the wealthy elite, which, notably, included a coat. In the nineteenth century, the invention of the sewing machine paired with existing textile machinery increased the affordability of mass-produced, ready-to-wear clothing and helped spur the popularity of wearing coats and jackets. By the mid-twentieth century the terms jacket and coat became confused for recent styles; the difference in use is still maintained for older garments.

Coats, jackets and overcoats

In the early 19th century, Western-style coats were divided into under-coats and overcoats. The term "under-coat" is now archaic but denoted the fact that the word coat could be both the outermost layer for outdoor wear (overcoat) or the coat is worn under that (under-coat). However, the term coat has begun to denote just the overcoat rather than the under-coat. The older usage of the word coat can still be found in the expression "to wear a coat and tie", which does not mean that wearer has on an overcoat. Nor do the terms tailcoat, morning coat or house coat denote types of overcoat. Indeed, an overcoat may be worn over the top of a tailcoat. In tailoring circles, the tailor who makes all types of coats is called a coat maker. Similarly, in American English, the term sports coat is used to denote a type of jacket not worn as outerwear (overcoat) (sports jacket in British English).

The term jacket is a traditional term usually used to refer to a specific type of short under-coat. Typical modern jackets extend only to the upper thigh in length, whereas older coats such as tailcoats are usually of knee length. The modern jacket worn with a suit is traditionally called a lounge coat (or a lounge jacket) in British English and a sack coat in American English. The American English term is rarely used. Traditionally, the majority of  men dressed in a coat and tie, although this has become gradually less widespread since the 1960s. Because the basic pattern for the stroller (black jacket worn with striped trousers in British English) and dinner jacket (tuxedo in American English) are the same as lounge coats, tailors traditionally call both of these special types of jackets a coat.

An overcoat is designed to be worn as the outermost garment worn as outdoor wear; while this use is still maintained in some places, particularly in Britain, elsewhere the term coat is commonly used mainly to denote only the overcoat, and not the under-coat. A topcoat is a slightly shorter overcoat, if any distinction is to be made. Overcoats worn over the top of knee length coats (under-coats) such as frock coats, dress coats, and morning coats are cut to be a little longer than the under-coat so as to completely cover it, as well as being large enough to accommodate the coat underneath.

The length of an overcoat varies: mid-calf being the most frequently found and the default when current fashion isn't concerned with hemlines. Designs vary from knee-length to ankle-length, briefly fashionable in the early 1970s and known (to contrast with the usurped mini) as the "maxi".

Speakers of American English sometimes informally use the words jacket and coat interchangeably.

Types

18th and 19th centuries

Men's 
Some of these styles are still worn. Note that for this period, only coats of the under-coat variety are listed, and overcoats are excluded.

Women's

Modern 

The terms coat and jacket are both used around the world. The modern terms "jacket" and "coat" are often used interchangeably as terms, although the term "coat" tends to be used to refer to longer garments. 

Modern coats include the:

 British Warm
 Car coat
 Chesterfield coat
 Covert coat
 Duffel coat
 Parka
 Pea coat
 Raincoat or Mackintosh
 Trench coat

See also
 Jacket
 Overcoat
 Robe
Tubada
White coat

Bibliography
Antongiavanni, Nicholas: The Suit, HarperCollins Publishers, New York, 2006. 
Byrd, Penelope: The Male Image: men's fashion in England 1300-1970. B. T. Batsford Ltd, London, 1979. 
Croonborg, Frederick: The Blue Book of Men's Tailoring. Croonborg Sartorial Co., New York and Chicago, 1907
Cunnington, C. Willett; Cunnington, Phillis (1959): Handbook of English Costume in the 19th Century, Plays Inc, Boston, 1970 reprint
Devere, Louis: The Handbook of Practical Cutting on the Centre Point System (London, 1866); revised and edited by R. L. Shep. R. L. Shep, Mendocino, California, 1986. 
Doyle, Robert: The Art of the Tailor, Sartorial Press Publications, Stratford, Ontario, 2005. 
Mansfield, Alan; Cunnington, Phillis: Handbook of English Costume in the 20th Century 1900-1950, Plays Inc, Boston, 1973 
Snodgrass, Mary Ellen: World Clothing and Fashion: An Encyclopedia of History, Culture, and Social Influence, Volume 1, Sharpe Reference, Armonk, NY, 2014. ISBN 978-0-7656-8300-7
Stephenson, Angus (editor): The Shorter Oxford Dictionary. Oxford University Press, New York, 2007
Unknown author: The Standard Work on Cutting Men’s Garments. 4th ed. Originally pub. 1886 by Jno J. Mitchell, New York. 
Vincent, W. D. F.: The Cutter’s Practical Guide. Vol II "All kinds of body coats". The John Williamson Company, London, circa 1893.
Waugh, Norah: The Cut of Men's Clothes 1600-1900, Routledge, London, 1964. 
Whife, A. A (ed): The Modern Tailor Outfitter and Clothier; 4th revised ed. 3 vols. The Caxton Publishing Company Ltd, London, 1951

References

General: Picken, Mary Brooks: The Fashion Dictionary, Funk and Wagnalls, 1957.  (1973 edition )

 
History of clothing (Western fashion)
Medieval European costume